Galantuomini (also known as Brave Men and Gentlemen) is a 2008 Italian crime-drama film directed by Edoardo Winspeare. It entered the main competition at the 2008 Rome Film Festival, in which Donatella Finocchiaro was awarded best actress.

Cast 

Donatella Finocchiaro: Lucia
Fabrizio Gifuni: Ignazio
Giuseppe Fiorello: Infantino
Giorgio Colangeli: Carmine Za'
Gioia Spaziani: Laura

References

External links

2008 films
Italian crime drama films
2008 crime drama films
2000s Italian films